Abeles is an English and Jewish surname, derived from the biblical name Abel. Notable people with the surname include:

Benjamin Abeles (1925-2020), American physicist
Edward Abeles (1869–1919), American actor
Florin Abelès (1922-2005), French physicist
John H Abeles (born 1945), American businessman
Kim Victoria Abeles (born 1952), American artist
Michele Abeles (born 1977), American artist
Peter Abeles (1924–1999), Australian businessman
Marcus Abeles (1837–1894), Austrian physician
Moshe Abeles (born 1936), Israeli brain researcher
Norman Abeles (born 1928), Austrian-born American psychologist
Ruth Abeles (born 1942), Israeli Olympic gymnast
Sigmund Abeles (born 1934), American Figurative Artist

See also
Abele (disambiguation)